The 2019 U.S. Men's Clay Court Championships (also known as the Fayez Sarofim & Co. U.S. Men's Clay Court Championships for sponsorship purposes) was a tennis tournament played on outdoor clay courts. It was the 51st edition of the U.S. Men's Clay Court Championships, and an ATP Tour 250 event on the 2019 ATP Tour. It took place at River Oaks Country Club in Houston, Texas, United States, from April 8 through April 14, 2019.

Singles main draw entrants

Seeds

Rankings are as of April 1, 2019.

Other entrants
The following players received wildcards into the main draw:
  Bjorn Fratangelo
  Noah Rubin
  Janko Tipsarević

The following players received entry via the qualifying draw:
  Daniel Elahi Galán 
  Santiago Giraldo 
  Peđa Krstin
  Henri Laaksonen

Withdrawals
Before the tournament
  John Isner → replaced by  Marcel Granollers
  Nick Kyrgios → replaced by  Paolo Lorenzi
  Yoshihito Nishioka → replaced by  Casper Ruud

Doubles main draw entrants

Seeds

 Rankings are as of April 1, 2019.

Other entrants
The following pairs received wildcards into the doubles main draw:
  Robert Galloway /  Nathaniel Lammons
  Lleyton Hewitt /  Jordan Thompson

Withdrawals
During the tournament
  Taylor Fritz

Champions

Singles

  Christian Garín def.  Casper Ruud, 7–6(7–4), 4–6, 6–3

Doubles

  Santiago González /  Aisam-ul-Haq Qureshi def.  Ken Skupski /  Neal Skupski, 3–6, 6–4, [10–6]

References

External links

Official website